Marinomonas profundimaris is a Gram-negative bacterium from the genus of Marinomonas which has been isolated from deep-sea sediments from the Arctic Ocean.

References

Oceanospirillales
Bacteria described in 2015